A Season in Hell (French: Une saison en enfer, Italian: Una stagione all'inferno) is a 1971 French-Italian drama film directed by Nelo Risi. The film tells the life and death of the poet Arthur Rimbaud and his troubled relationship with the poet Paul Verlaine until the African adventure in Ethiopia.

Plot  
1871. As soon as he arrived at the age of seventeen in Paris, Arthur Rimbaud was hosted by the poet Verlaine, struck by some poems previously sent to him by Rimbaud. Verlaine soon realizes that he is dealing with a genius, founder of a new and ruthless model of poetics and writing and is completely entranced, to the point of spending much of his time with him rather than with his wife.

Soon this friendship turns into homosexual love and the people, including his wife, do not look favorably on it, so much so that the two poets are forced to settle in England. After a couple of years of stormy life spent there, Rimbaud and Verlaine quarrel for the last time; As Arthur returns to his family farm in the countryside, Verlaine is arrested for attempted murder.

After a few months Verlaine discovers that Arthur has gone to Africa, in Ethiopia, to fulfill his dream. In the place the poet writes the most beautiful compositions, in the company of a black girl who assists and cares for him, until Rimbaud falls seriously ill. He accuses a tumor in his leg and is forced to return to France to have it amputated. His illness got worse and worse, until he died in 1891.

Cast 
 Terence Stamp as Arthur Rimbaud
 Jean-Claude Brialy as Paul Verlaine
 Florinda Bolkan as Gennet
 Nike Arrighi as Mathilde Verlaine
 Pier Paolo Capponi 
 Pascal Mazzotti 
 William Sabatier 
 Gabriella Giacobbe    
 Joshua Sinclair as Arthur Rimbaud (child)

See also    
 Total Eclipse (1995)
 List of Italian films of 1971

References

External links

1970s biographical drama films
1971 drama films
1971 films
1971 LGBT-related films
Biographical films about writers
Cultural depictions of Arthur Rimbaud
Films directed by Nelo Risi
French biographical drama films
Italian biographical drama films
1970s Italian-language films
English-language French films
English-language Italian films
1970s English-language films
LGBT-related drama films
1971 multilingual films
French multilingual films
Italian multilingual films
1970s Italian films
1970s French films
French-language Italian films